Proteales is an order of flowering plants consisting of three (or four) families. The Proteales have been recognized by almost all taxonomists.

The representatives of the Proteales are very different from each other.  The order contains plants that do not look alike at all. What they have in common is seeds with little or no endosperm. The ovules are often atropic.

Families
Within the classification system of Rolf Dahlgren, the Proteales were in the superorder Proteiflorae, also called Proteanae; The APG II system (of 2003) also recognizes this order, placing it in the clade Eudicots, with the following circumscription:

 order Proteales
 family Nelumbonaceae
 family Proteaceae [+ family Platanaceae]

with "+ ..." = optionally separate family (that may be split off from the preceding family).

The APG III system of 2009 followed this same approach, but favored the narrower circumscription of the three families, firmly recognizing three families in Proteales: Nelumbonaceae, Platanaceae, and Proteaceae. The Angiosperm Phylogeny Website, however, suggests the addition of Sabiaceae, which the APG III system did not place in any order in the eudicots, would be sensible.

The APG IV system of 2016 added family Sabiaceae to the order.

Well-known members of the Proteales include the proteas of South Africa, the banksia and macadamia of Australia, the planetree, and the sacred lotus. The origins of the order are clearly ancient, with evidence of diversification in the mid-Cretaceous, roughly over 100 million years ago. Of notable interest is the family’s modern distribution; the Proteaceae is predominantly a Southern Hemisphere family, while the Platanaceae and Nelumbonaceae are Northern Hemisphere plants.

Classification
The current APG IV classification represents a slight change from the APG I system of 1998, which firmly did accept family Platanaceae as being separate from the order. Under APG IV, this is the current circumscription of the order: 
 order Proteales
 family Nelumbonaceae
 family Platanaceae
 family Proteaceae
 family Sabiaceae

Cronquist
The Cronquist system of 1981 recognized such an order and placed it in subclass Rosidae in class Magnoliopsida [=dicotyledons]. It used this circumscription:
 order Proteales
 family Elaeagnaceae
 family Proteaceae

Dahlgren; Thorne; Engler; and Wettstein
The Dahlgren system and Thorne system (1992) recognized such an order and placed it in superorder Proteanae in subclass Magnoliidae  [=dicotyledons]. The Engler system, in its update of 1964, also recognized this order and placed it in subclass Archichlamydeae of class Dicotyledoneae. The Wettstein system, last revised in 1935, recognized this order and placed it in the Monochlamydeae in subclass Choripetalae of class Dicotyledones. These systems used the following circumscription:
 order Proteales
 family Proteaceae

References

 
Angiosperm orders